Kevin Conway (born April 15, 1979) is an American professional stock car racing driver who currently races in the Blancpain Super Trofeo Championship. He is the 2010 NASCAR Sprint Cup Series Rookie of the Year (ROTY), 2014 Super Trofeo World Champion, and two-time North American Super Trofeo Series Champion. Conway has raced in motocross, legends, the World Karting Association, United States Automobile Club (USAC), American Speed Association (ASA), NASCAR's regional K&N Pro Series West, and all three of NASCAR's national touring series.

A protege of Cup Series winner Ernie Irvan and longtime test driver for Cup teams, Conway is best known for his association with the male enhancement product ExtenZe from 2009 to 2011. The sponsorship led ultimately to Conway's first full-time NASCAR season and ROTY effort in 2010, but also led to lawsuits from former teams due to unpaid sponsorship funds. Conway appeared on Shark Tank in 2021 as a business partner for the company “Phoozy”, which made specialized smartphone cases.

Racing career

Early career
Conway began his career racing at age six, running AMA motocross, go-karts, and winged midget cars. Moving to Charlotte, North Carolina as a teenager, Conway became the youngest legends car national champion in 1994, at the age of 15. Conway would later race late model stock cars in NASCAR's regional Dodge Weekly Racing Series.

2002–2005
Conway moved to major-league stock car racing in 2002, when he made his debut in the ARCA RE/MAX Series. His first race came in the No. 17 Eagle One/Valvoline Chevrolet for A. J. Henriksen, Ernie Irvan, and George deBidart at Atlanta Motor Speedway, where he started fifth and finished thirteenth after a rear axle problem late in the race. In his next race that fall at Lowe's he finished seventh. Conway also served as a test driver for NASCAR Winston Cup Series team MB2 Motorsports.

In 2003, Conway made his NASCAR Busch Series debut at Atlanta in the No. 22 for Bost Racing, qualifying 27th and finishing 33rd. In 2004 he made his career debut in the Winston West Series at Fontana in the No. 28 Ford owned by Ernie Irvan, racing against Cup Series regular Ken Schrader and future Cup drivers Clint Bowyer and David Gilliland. Conway qualified and finished fifth after leading much of the race. Conway attempted three Busch Series races in 2004, failing to qualify for all three. In 2005, Conway signed to run the No. 03 Chevrolet for Gary Keller and Mark Smith, but failed to qualify for the first two races of the season. He made his only start of the season at Darlington Raceway in the No. 43 Channellock/Supra Boats Dodge for the Curb Agajanian Performance Group, where he finished 29th.

2006
In 2006, he declared for Busch Series Rookie of the Year honors, driving the No. 58 Carver Racing Dodge, which was in the process of purchasing equipment from Glynn Motorsports. After the team switched to the No. 40 for Richmond, the team suspended operations, leaving Conway out of a ride after four starts. He competed in the West Series once again at Irwindale Speedway for James Pritchard, where he finished eighth.

2007
In 2007, Conway joined Joe Gibbs Racing's Busch program, signing on for eight races in the team's No. 18 Chevrolet. Conway brought sponsorship from Z-Line Designs, who partnered with him on the recommendation of former driver Lake Speed, and shared the ride with drivers Tony Stewart, Denny Hamlin, Brad Coleman and Aric Almirola. Conway struggled in the ride, having an average finish of 29.4, 9 positions worse than his teammates in the same ride. He was released at the end of the 2007 season, though Z-Line would continue to sponsor JGR.

2009: Various Cup/Nationwide teams
After spending the 2008 season out of NASCAR, Conway returned in 2009 with sponsorship from his male enhancement product ExtenZe. He began racing midway through the season in the No. 87 for Braun Racing (using the No. 87 owners points from NEMCO Motorsports), and had a career-best fifteenth-place finish at Kentucky Speedway. He also ran a race for R3 Motorsports and later K Automotive Racing to finish out the Nationwide season. He made his first Camping World Truck Series race at Phoenix, finishing nineteenth in Rob Fuller's truck, as well as an unsuccessful attempt to qualify for a Sprint Cup race in the No. 70 TRG Motorsports Chevy.

2010

Front Row Motorsports

Initially planning to run full-time in the Nationwide Series, in 2010 Conway signed to drive the No. 37 ExtenZe Ford in the Sprint Cup Series for Front Row Motorsports as a teammate to Travis Kvapil and David Gilliland. Conway's lack of superspeedway experience caused him to delay his Rookie of the Year campaign, as NASCAR would not give him approval to compete in the Daytona 500. Kvapil raced the 37 at Daytona, while John Andretti ran Kvapil's 34 car. Conway earned a career best finish of 14th at Daytona International Speedway in July, one of only 3 finishes better than 30th in 2010. As the only fully sponsored driver in the Front Row stable, he rotated among the team's No. 34, No. 37, and No. 38 cars in order to remain in a Top 35-ranked car that would guarantee a starting spot. Prior to the August race at Michigan, Conway and the ExtenZe sponsor logos were removed from the car, with Tony Raines replacing him. Conway and ExtenZe would go on to be sued by Front Row Motorsports for lack of payment, which they cited as the reason Conway was removed from the car.

Robby Gordon Motorsports

Conway returned to competition with Robby Gordon Motorsports at Bristol, and ran 7 races in the No. 7 car, as well as attempting one in the teams No. 07 car, missing the race at Charlotte. Owner Robby Gordon would also get into a sponsorship dispute with Conway and Extenze, which turned violent the next season.

Conway won the NASCAR Rookie of the Year award for 2010 by default, as his only competitor, Terry Cook, ran only 3 of the first 10 races during the year. It was the least competitive rookie of the year battle in modern NASCAR history up to that point. Conway ran 28 races in 2010.

2011

For 2011, it was announced that Conway would enter the Budweiser Shootout (eligible due to winning Rookie of the Year in 2010), Daytona 500, and possibly a few more races for Joe Nemechek and NEMCO Motorsports in the No. 97 Toyota with sponsorship from ExtenZe. Conway attempted 4 races, qualifying for 3 of them, in which he finished last in each.

Conway also ran 9 races in the Nationwide Series for NEMCO, with an average finish of 28.1. He was released from NEMCO at the end of the season and has not competed in NASCAR since.

2013
In 2013 Conway competed in the North American Lamborghini Blancpain Super Trofeo Series. Over the course of the season he drove a race prepared, lightweight, four-wheel-drive, 570 horsepower version of the Lamborghini Gallardo LP 570-4 to win the series championship in the Pro-Am division. The final Super Trofeo Series race weekend was held in conjunction with the IndyCar season finale race weekend at Auto Club Speedway in Fontana, CA.

Personal life
A native of Lynchburg, Virginia, Conway earned a marketing degree at the University of North Carolina at Charlotte. Conway started the marketing company Exclaim Racing, which organized his sponsorship deals. He also served as an instructor at the Richard Petty Driving Experience. Conway's father Sam was a former team manager for Darrell Waltrip Motorsports, and a board member for Motor Racing Outreach. Sam died from lung cancer in 2007 at age 58.

Motorsports career results

NASCAR
(key) (Bold – Pole position awarded by qualifying time. Italics – Pole position earned by points standings or practice time. * – Most laps led.)

Sprint Cup Series

Daytona 500

Nationwide Series

Camping World Truck Series

ARCA Racing Series
(key) (Bold – Pole position awarded by qualifying time. Italics – Pole position earned by points standings or practice time. * – Most laps led.)

References

External links
 

Living people
1979 births
People from Cornelius, North Carolina
Racing drivers from Charlotte, North Carolina
NASCAR drivers
Sportspeople from Lynchburg, Virginia
ARCA Menards Series drivers
Joe Gibbs Racing drivers
USAC Silver Crown Series drivers
Michelin Pilot Challenge drivers
Lamborghini Super Trofeo drivers